Plažane is a village situated in Despotovac municipality in Serbia.

Populated places in Pomoravlje District